Gurandan may refer to:
 Gurandan, Gilan
 Gurandan, Hormozgan